Tulì is a Filipino rite of male circumcision. It has a long historical tradition and is considered an obligatory rite of passage for males; those who have not undergone the ritual are ridiculed and labeled supót by their peers.

Circumcision is not considered a religious rite in the Philippines, as some four-fifths of Filipinos profess Roman Catholicism, which does not require it. Rather, circumcision is a social norm rooted in tradition that is followed by society at large. Most boys usually undergo the procedure not shortly after birth but prior to reaching puberty or before high school (around ages 10–14).

There exists two common ways of undergoing tuli: either the traditional way by a local village circumciser (known in Tagalog as having it done "de-pukpok") or having it done by medical practitioners in a hospital or clinical setting.


Background
Circumcision in the Philippines, as practiced today, is not a religious rite. Circumcision is also not practiced by a majority of Christians worldwide. The practice appears to be traceable as being pre-Hispanic period in nature. A common theory posits that the prevalence of the practise is due to the influence of Islam, which was prevalent in parts of the archipelago at least 200 years before the arrival of Christianity in the 16th century. It was also noted in Vocabulario de la Lengua Tagala that other synonyms of tuli are catan (katan in modern Filipino orthography) and sonat which were from Arabic khitan and Malay sunat, respectively.

Antonio de Morga, a Spanish lawyer and high-ranking colonial official in the Philippines during the 17th century, noted in his 1609 book Sucesos de las islas Filipinas:

To which the prolific Filipino writer and nationalist Jose Rizal added in his 1890 annotated version of Moraga's work: "This custom [circumcision] has not fallen into disuse among the Filipinos, even among the Catholics."

In a 1903 article "Circumcision and Flagellation among the Filipinos" published in the Journal of the Association of Military Surgeons, Lieutenant Charles Norton Barney, of the medical department of the U. S. Army, noted that circumcision was "a very ancient custom among the Philippine indios, and so generalized that at least seventy or eighty per cent of males in the Tagál country have undergone the operation." He also noted that those who were uncircumcised and reached the age of puberty were taunted as "supút" by children of both sexes.

Contemporary practice
More affluent parents opt to have their children circumcised as neonates in hospital, but the majority prefer that their sons undergo the tradition at around 8–12 years of age. Boys of the same age group would either go to government-sponsored missions, hospitals, or to a local circumciser. Boys normally undergo the procedure during the summer break before the start of classes as to allow time for healing. The most commonly-done procedure is in actuality not a circumcision but a dorsal slit, where no foreskin is actually removed. When the foreskin is removed, it is commonly known locally as a "German cut" in reference to the introduction of the modern surgical technique by the founder of plastic and reconstructive surgery, Johann Friedrich Dieffenbach.

The Philippines Department of Health meanwhile sponsors an annual Operation Tuli project to circumcise boys; others assist and provide the service for free.

The traditional circumcision makes use of a curved piece of wood which is anchored into the ground. The protruding part of this apparatus is pointed at its end: the foreskin of the boy being circumcised is drawn over this protruding part. The circumciser rests his knife lengthwise across the boy's foreskin and then a quick blow is made with a stick, slicing the upper foreskin into two and exposing the glans. Prior to and while the procedure is being performed, the boy is told to chew guava leaves. The masticated guava leaves are applied onto the wound as a poultice and is bandaged. The boy is then to wash off in the cold waters of a nearby river. While this procedure is commonly known as a circumcision, it is more accurately described as a superincision as no foreskin is removed during the procedure.

Newly circumcised boys usually wear housedresses or loose skirts to help in the healing. The swelling that might occur during this period is termed pangángamatis (literally, "becoming like a tomato", kamatis) owing to the reddish appearance of the penis.

According to the United Nations World Health Organisation: "In the Philippines, where circumcision is almost universal and typically occurs at age 10–14 years, a survey of boys found strong evidence of social determinants, with two thirds of boys choosing to be circumcised simply “to avoid being uncircumcised”, and 41% stating that it was “part of the tradition”

The rite has been the subject of the award-winning 2005 film Tuli by Auraeus Solito.

References

Philippine traditions
Circumcision